The Middlesex Championships or Middlesex Lawn Tennis Championships and also known as the Middlesex Open Tennis Championships was a men's and women's grass court tennis tournament held at the Chiswick Park Lawn Tennis Club,Chiswick Park, Chiswick, Middlesex, Great Britain from 1884 to 1949.

History
In 1883 William Cavendish, 7th Duke of Devonshire decided to lease some of his land, with a low annual ground rent for the residents Chiswick who wanted to establish a sports club. This new sports ground staged bowls, cricket, football, and lawn tennis. In Chiswick Park Cricket and Lawn Tennis Club was formed and established a Middlesex County Championship tennis tournament. The championships were usually held annually at the end of July through to the third week August. In 1887 "Challenge Cups" were presented to the winners of the men's and women's singles events. In 1893 the scheduling of the tournament was altered to start at the end of May through to early June.

The Chiswick Park Lawn Tennis Club continued to stage the annual Championship of Middlesex, making the venue second only to Wimbledon in importance. In 1925 the land lease arrangement came to end due it expiring, however by this point the former tennis and cricket clubs had by this point formed into a business entity the Chiswick Cricket and Lawn Tennis Company. The tournament was not held during World War One and was postponed again in 1939 following the outbreak of World War Two. In 1946 the tournaments grounds were issued with a compulsory purchase by Brentford and Chiswick Urban District Council. After this tournament staged only. The Middlesex Championships ran for 59 years, and was quite successful in attracting attract top players to four championships until 1949 when it was abolished.

Notable winners of the men's  singles included Charles Walder Grinstead (1884), Ernest Wool Lewis (1886–1890, 1892), Athar-Ali Fyzee, (1921), Henry Mayes (1926) Daniel Prenn (1935), Czeslaw Spychala (1946) and Ghaus Mohammad (1947). Previous women's singles champions included Maud Shackle (1891–1893), Edith Austin Greville (1894, 1905),  Molla Bjurstedt Mallory (1926) and Jadwiga Jędrzejowska (1938).

References

Sources
 Baily's Magazine of Sports & Pastimes. London: Vinton and Co Limited. 1896.
 Clegg, Gill. "Entertainment :Chiswick Park Lawn Tennis Club". brentfordandchiswicklhs.org.uk. Brentford and Chiswick Local History Society. Retrieved 4 October 2022.
 Heathcote, J. M. Heathacote: C. G. (1890). Tennis; Lawn Tennis. London: Spottiswoode, Ballantyne & co. ltd. 
 Tennis Championships. Kalgoorlie Miner. Trove: National Library of Australia. 31 May 1922. Retrieved 4 October 2022.

Grass court tennis tournaments
Defunct tennis tournaments in the United Kingdom
Tennis tournaments in England